Marcel Laurenz Lotka (born 25 May 2001) is a professional footballer who plays as a goalkeeper for Borussia Dortmund. Born in Germany, he represents Poland as a youth international.

In March 2022, Lotka signed a two-year contract with Borussia Dortmund II, starting in the 2022–23 season, but after several games in the starting line-up of Hertha BSC with positive acclaim, the Berlin-based club started exploring options to reverse the deal and keep the player for the next season. However, this appeal was unsuccessful; in May 2022, Lotka's move to Dortmund was officially confirmed.

References

External links
Profile at the Borussia Dortmund website

2001 births
Living people
German footballers
Polish footballers
German people of Polish descent
Citizens of Poland through descent
Association football goalkeepers
MSV Duisburg players
FC Schalke 04 players
Rot-Weiss Essen players
Bayer 04 Leverkusen players
Hertha BSC II players
Hertha BSC players
Borussia Dortmund II players
Borussia Dortmund players
Regionalliga players
3. Liga players
Bundesliga players
Poland youth international footballers
Poland under-21 international footballers
Footballers from Duisburg